Powers That Prey is a 1918 silent comedy-drama film directed by Henry King and starring Mary Miles Minter, with whom King stated that he enjoyed working. The film is based on a story called Extra! Extra! by Will M. Ritchey, which was also the working title of the film. As with many of Minter's features, it is thought to be a lost film.

Plot

As described in various film magazine reviews, Sylvia Grant (Minter) is the daughter of Burton Grant (Clark), the owner of the Daily News. Her father makes an enemy of crooked local politician Jarvis McVey (Burton) after he threatens to expose his shady dealings with a railroad company. Forced to leave town for his own safety, Burton Grant travels to Sylvia's boarding school and tells her where to find the necessary paperwork to install editor Frank Summers (Forrest) as the paper's manager.

Sylvia, however, who runs her school's newspaper and has journalistic ambitions of her own, fills in her name on the power-of-attorney rather than Summers', and takes over the running of the Daily News. She runs the paper according to her own ideals, exposing various merchants who behave in a way that she does not think proper, and discharges many of the staff who oppose her methods, including Summers.

On the verge of ruining the paper, Sylvia happens to overhear McVey plotting to betray the city for his own profit. She rushes to publish an extra, exposing him and calling for him to be tarred and feathered. Summers, despite Sylvia's attempts to fire him, stays around and helps her to condemn McVey. Just as the townsfolk are preparing to act on her suggestion, her father returns.

McVey, having been discredited, leaves town, and with the Daily News taking much of the credit, Sylvia's other journalistic efforts are forgiven and the paper is saved. Summers is returned to his position as editor, and he and Sylvia become engaged.

Cast
 Mary Miles Minter as Sylvia Grant
 Allan Forrest as Frank Summers
 Harvey Clark as Burton Grant
 Clarence Burton as Jarvis McVey
 Lucille Ward as Mrs. Brackett
 Emma Kluge as Mrs. Sharon
 Perry Banks as George Lake
 Robert Miller as Bobs

References

External links

1918 films
1918 comedy-drama films
American silent feature films
American black-and-white films
Films directed by Henry King
1910s English-language films
1910s American films
Silent American comedy-drama films